Giovanni Carnovali (29 September 1804 – 5 July 1873), known as Il Piccio ('the little one'), was an Italian painter.

Biography
Carnovali was born in Montegrino Valtravaglia (Varese).  In 1815, at the age of just 11, he was admitted to the Carrara Academy in Bergamo under the guidance of the director Giuseppe Diotti, who immediately recognised his young pupil's natural talent. The artist soon began to break away from the strict Neoclassicism of his academic training and return to the figurative tradition of the 16th and 17th century, which he interpreted with great expressive freedom, especially in portrait painting. His debut at the exhibition of the Carrara Academy and his first major public commission for a work on a religious subject came in 1826. After the first short trips for study purposes, made on foot in the second half of the 1820s, he travelled as far as Rome in 1831 and stopped in Parma on the way back.

Carnovali's pupils included Tranquillo Cremona.  There are records of a second stay in Rome in 1843 and a long trip to Naples in 1845. He moved to Milan in 1838 and took part in the Brera exhibitions just twice, in 1839 and 1840. These years saw a shift towards painting of a less descriptive character with soft, hazy outlines under the influence of Correggio and Andrea Appiani as well as the French art seen in Paris around 1840. This change in style culminated in the rejection of a work by the ecclesiastical commission of Anzano in 1863 due to its unprecedented freedom and daringly experimental handling of light.  Carnovali died in Cremona, aged 68.

Gallery

References
 Elena Lissoni, Giovanni Carnovali , online catalogue Artgate by Fondazione Cariplo, 2010, CC BY-SA (source for the first revision of this article).

Other projects

19th-century Italian painters
Italian male painters
People from the Province of Varese
1804 births
1873 deaths
19th-century Italian male artists